Stillerska Filmgymnasiet is an upper secondary school located on Lidingö, Sweden. It was founded 2009 and the first students started the school the same autumn. Stillerska is a film school where you learn directing, cinematography, sound and much more in the film industry. The school’s ambition is to include film in every core subject which gives the school a creative spirit. The semester of fall 2015 started on August 26, when all other upper secondary school students that year started on the 17th.

Awards
Students from Stillerska Filmgymnasiet have been awarded in Amnesty’s film festival “Angeläget” two years in a row. 2010 with the documentary “Ett Jävla Jobb” made by Filip Stankovic, Simon Linde, Michelle Hammarstrand, Felicia Budrée and Axel Hejdenberg.  2011 with the documentary “Hamid” made by Algot Sergio Ramos Åberg, Måns Rydberg, Jens Rosengren, Frej Liljenroth and Alessio El Ghoul. 

The film Jag ser, jag hör, jag vet won for Best Film and Audience Award during the 2016 Amnesty Festival.

Stillvision
Every spring Stillerska open its doors to the public, the students show their productions and artwork at the Stillvision screening.

Selected filmography

Short films
Life (2012)
Samlaren (2012) - starring Sven Wollter
Falsk Garanti (2012) - starring Jakob Stadell
Grannar (2013)
Minnen (2013)
Väggen (2013)
Långa Snubben Dog (2013) - featuring Keijo Salmela
Ben & Jerry (2014)
Håltimmen (2014)
Arden (2014)
Jorden (2015)
Charlie (2015)
Falsk Garanti (2015)
Den Svenska Drömmen (2015)
Stjärnfallet (2016)
Drivved (2016) - with Kim Sulocki
De Röda Träden (2016) - starring Magnus Krepper & Roberto Gonzalez
Välkomna till Soltorp (2017)
Direct Deposit (2017)
Memoria (2018)
Käre Far (2018)
Stackars Djur (2018) - with Kajsa Ernst, Ann Petrén & Ulf Brunnberg

Documentaries
Ett jävla jobb (2010)
Hamid (2011)
Bara jag (2014)
SOS Kiosken (2015)
Skylta med problemen (2015)
Jag ser, jag hör, jag vet (2016)
Min Bruno (2016)
Jag ser, jag hör, jag vet (2016)
Ensam, inte stark (2017) with Martin Schibbye

References

External links
 More information about Stillerska Filmgymnasiet
 Films made by students at Stillerska

Schools in Sweden
Educational institutions established in 2009
Schools in Stockholm
2009 establishments in Sweden